Disulfur diiodide is an unstable chemical compound with the formula S2I2. It is a red-brown solid that decomposes above -30 °C to elemental sulfur and iodine.

Production

Reaction of sulfur and iodine
The first attempt and claim to produce a sulfur iodide were made in 1813 by Bernard Courtois when exploring the properties of his newly discovered element, iodine. He reacted to sulfur and iodine, claiming they had made a compound. However, this production was doubted by Gay-Lussac. Between 1827 and 1896, more attempts were made to make sulfur iodide by combining the elements; however, all were inconclusive on the existence of the compound or failed. Later, when thermal analysis was developed, it was shown that when the elements were combined, it only resulted in a mixture, not a compound.

Production by double replacement
When attempts to produce sulfur iodide by the direct combination of the elements failed to overcome the low thermodynamic stability of the compound, production by double replacement was attempted between 1833 and 1886. Some reactions that were attempted was the reaction of disulfur dichloride and hydroiodic acid:
(S2)Cl2 + 2HI → (S2)I2 + 2HCl
The reaction of hydrogen sulfide and iodine trichloride:
3H2S + 2ICl3 → (S3)I2 + 6HCl
The reaction of hydroiodic acid and sulfur:
2HI + 3S → H2S + (S2)I2
The reaction of disulfur dichloride and potassium iodide:
(S2)Cl2 + 2KI → (S2)I2 + 2KCl
and more, all assumed to have failed to produce sulfur iodide. However, the reaction between S2Cl2 and HI attempted in 1835 was later proven to have produced disulfur diiodide.

In 1940, another production was attempted with the fourth reaction and was reported to have detected various sulfur iodides, such as disulfur diiodide and sulfur diiodide(SI2). When observing the reaction of very dilute disulfur dichloride in carbon tetrachloride and potassium iodide:
S2Cl2 + 2 KI → 2S + I2 + 2KCl
they observed a color change from yellow to reddish-brown to finally violet, which was assumed to be evidence for the formation of sulfur iodides. The compound was found to decompose at room temperature slowly in a solution, with the decomposition rate increasing with increasing temperature.

Isolation
Disulfur diiodide was first isolated by the reaction of disulfur dichloride and potassium iodide, sodium iodide, or hydrogen iodide in pentane at -90 °C, and verified by infrared spectroscopy.

Properties
Disulfur diiodide is light-sensitive and is soluble in various haloalkanes, such as carbon tetrachloride.

Other sulfur iodides
Sulfur diiodide(SI2) has finally been reported in an argon matrix at 9 K by the reaction of sulfur dichloride and iodine; however, this has been disputed.

Sulfur and iodine react in antimony pentafluoride or arsenic trifluoride to form the S7I+ ion, which is stable at room temperature, unlike other sulfur-iodine compounds.

References

Sulfur halides
Iodides